FK Timok 1919 is a football club based in Zaječar, Serbia. They compete in the Serbian League East, the third tier of the national league system.

History
Founded in 1919, the club participated in the regional leagues during its early stages. They achieved their first notable success by defeating Dinamo Zagreb 3–1 in the first round of the 1973 Yugoslav Cup. The club also competed in the Yugoslav Second League for three seasons between 1981 and 1984.

After the dissolution of SFR Yugoslavia, the club advanced to the second tier for the second time, finishing bottom of the table in the 1992–93 Second League of FR Yugoslavia. They would later spend two seasons in the Second League of Serbia and Montenegro from 2002 to 2004, when they were relegated to the Serbian League East.

The club made one of its greatest achievements in its history during the 2005–06 Serbia and Montenegro Cup by eliminating Partizan away in the round of 16. After a 1–1 draw in regular time, Timok won 5–4 on penalties. The club was eventually knocked out of the competition in the quarter-finals after losing 2–0 away to Radnički Niš.

In the 2008–09 season, the club finished second in the Serbian League East, subsequently losing 5–4 on penalties to Teleoptik (after two 1–1 draws) in the promotion playoffs. They were finally promoted to the Serbian First League after winning the 2011–12 Serbian League East title. The club spent two seasons in the second tier of Serbian football, before being relegated back to the Serbian League East in 2014.

After finishing second from the bottom in the 2017–18 Serbian League East, the club got relegated to the fourth tier and was supposed to play in the Zone League East. However, they were unable to compete due to financial reasons, causing them to go inactive. Simultaneously, the Zaječar District League champions and the Zone League East newcomers, FK Radnički Lubnica was relocated to Zaječar and renamed to FK Timok 1919, becoming FK Timok's de facto successor.

Honours
Serbian League Timok / Serbian League East (Tier 3)
 2001–02 / 2011–12, 2020–21

Seasons

Supporters

The club's main supporters group is known as Otrovi (The Poisons). They were founded in 1998, celebrating their 10-year anniversary in a Serbian League East fixture with Župa Aleksandrovac on 15 November 2008. The group is traditionally situated in the east stand of the stadium.

Notable players
This is a list of players who have played at full international level.
  Yaw Antwi
  Darko Božović
  Goran Nikolić
  Aleksandar Andrejević
  Živan Ljukovčan
  Dragan Pantelić
''For a list of all FK Timok players with a Wikipedia article, see :Category:FK Timok players'

Managerial history

References

External links
 Club page at Srbijasport

 
1919 establishments in Serbia
Association football clubs established in 1919
Football clubs in Serbia
Sport in Zaječar